The 2017–18 Stetson Hatters women's basketball team represents Stetson University in the 2017–18 NCAA Division I women's basketball season. The Hatters, led by tenth year head coach Lynn Bria, play their home games at Edmunds Center and were members of the Atlantic Sun Conference. They finished the season 17–15, 8–6 in A-Sun play to finish in third place. They lost in the quarterfinals of the A-Sun women's tournament to North Florida. They were invited to the Women's Basketball Invitational where they lost to South Alabama in the first round.

Media
All home games and conference road are shown on ESPN3 or A-Sun.TV. Non conference road games are typically available on the opponents website. Audio broadcasts of Hatters games can be found on WSBB AM 1230/1490 with Ryan Rouse on the call.

Roster

Schedule

|-
!colspan=9 style="background:#; color:#FFFFFF;"| Non-conference regular season

|-
!colspan=9 style="background:#; color:#FFFFFF;"| Atlantic Sun regular season

|-
!colspan=9 style="background:#; color:#FFFFFF;"| Atlantic Sun Tournament

|-
!colspan=9 style="background:#; color:#FFFFFF;"| WBI

Rankings
2017–18 NCAA Division I women's basketball rankings

See also
 2017–18 Stetson Hatters men's basketball team

References

Stetson
Stetson Hatters women's basketball seasons
Stetson
Stetson Hatters
Stetson Hatters